Edward Easter Collins (28 March 1866 – 8 April 1936) was an Australian politician.

He was born in Hawthorn to shepherd Francis Smith Collins and Ellen Kibble. He was educated in Geelong and became a wool merchant, settling in Wagga Wagga. In 1885 he married Emma Clayton, with whom he had two children. He was an alderman at Wagga Wagga from 1910 to 1922 and from 1923 to 1936, serving as mayor four times (1912–14, 1917–20, 1925–27, 1928–34). From 1932 to 1934 and from 1934 to 1936 he was a United Australia Party member of the New South Wales Legislative Council. Collins died in Manly in 1936.

References

1866 births
1936 deaths
United Australia Party members of the Parliament of New South Wales
Members of the New South Wales Legislative Council